Orcik candy is a confection made of walnuts and a slightly fermented juice called şıra that is made with grapes or blackberries. It is a regional specialty of Elazığ. It is similar to churchkhela (called cevizli sucuk in Turkish), but the walnut and grape mixture is stuffed into hand pulled candy.

References

Elazığ
Candy
Turkish desserts